Daishōhō Masami (7 May 1967 – 4 December 1999) was a sumo wrestler from Hokkaidō, Japan. His highest rank was komusubi.

Career
Born in Sapporo, he took up skiing as a young boy, as he came from an area famous for its ski slopes. He also played basketball at school. However his father was an amateur sumo enthusiast and encouraged his son to try the sport.  In his third year of junior high he took part in the National Junior High School Sumo Championships, held in Tokyo, and was put up in Tatsunami stable during the championships. Daishoho was an amateur sumo champion at Nihon University, and after graduation he returned to Tatsunami stable. He entered professional sumo in January 1990 at the makushita level, and quickly reached the top makuuchi division in July 1991. His best performance in a tournament was in September 1992 when he was runner-up to Takahanada with 11 wins. He reached his highest rank of komusubi in January 1993, but after that he was plagued by a number of injuries to his knees, back and triceps. He fell back to the jūryō division after pulling out of the January 1997 tournament on the 4th day.

Retirement and death
In 1999 Daishoho was diagnosed with pancreatic cancer. He wanted to receive treatment whilst still remaining active on the dohyo, but in June he was persuaded by his doctors to enter hospital full-time and so retired from sumo. Since it was clear that he would be unlikely to live long enough to have a formal retirement ceremony (danpatsu-shiki) at the Ryogoku Kokugikan, which normally takes place up to a year after retiring, in October 1999 his fellow wrestler and graduate of Nihon University Mainoumi organised a private function for him which was attended by around 400 people including wrestlers such as Konishiki and Musashimaru and his former stablemaster Haguroyama, although senior members of the Sumo Association and his former coach at Nihon University Hidetoshi Tanaka did not attend as it was an unsanctioned event. Daishoho's weight had dropped from 150 kg to below 90 kg. He died on 4 December 1999 at the age of 32 due to pancreatic cancer.

Fighting style
Daishoho liked pushing techniques, particularly tsuppari, a series of rapid thrusts to the chest. However, he was also good at fighting on the mawashi or belt, where he preferred a migi-yotsu grip, a left hand outside and right hand inside position. His most commonly used kimarite were yorikiri (force out), oshidashi (push out) and uwatenage (overarm throw).

Career record

See also
List of sumo tournament second division champions
Glossary of sumo terms
List of past sumo wrestlers
List of komusubi

References

External links

1967 births
1999 deaths
Deaths from cancer in Japan
Deaths from pancreatic cancer
Japanese sumo wrestlers
Nihon University alumni
Sportspeople from Sapporo
Sumo people from Hokkaido